Pelican Lake 191D is an Indian reserve of the Pelican Lake First Nation in Saskatchewan. It is 11 kilometres northeast of Meadow Lake.

References

Indian reserves in Saskatchewan
Pelican Lake First Nation